The John Ward House at 184 Ward Street in Newton, Massachusetts is a Federal style house.  It was deemed eligible for listing on the National Register of Historic Places in 1986, but its owner objected to the listing.

The house is a circa 1805 house built in Federal style on a  lot.

The house has a square plan with five bays on each side.  It has a truncated hip roof, and its entrance is flanked by elongated pilasters.

Three comparable Federal houses along Ward street are:
Charles Hyde House, 175 Ward Street, c. 1801
Ephraim Ward House, 121 Ward Street, built in 1821
John Harback House, 303 Ward Street, c. 1800
The latter two are individually listed on the NRHP.

References

Houses in Newton, Massachusetts
Federal architecture in Massachusetts
1805 establishments in Massachusetts